Saša Vidović (born 14 February 1982) is a Bosnian Serb footballer who plays as a midfielder with Canadian Soccer League club BGH City.

Playing career
Born in Banja Luka, SR Bosnia and Herzegovina, during his early career he played in Austria for many years, and in minor Serbian clubs as FK Srem Jakovo and FK Mladost Lukićevo, in January 2004 Vidović signed with Serbian top league club FK Zemun, where he will play three and a half seasons. In 2007, after his club was relegated, he signed with a Serbian Superliga club FK Rad. From 2004 until summer 2009, Vidović played an impressive 116 top league matches, having scored six goals. His estimated market value in summer 2009 is 250.000 Euros. He can play as comunitarian because holds Austrian passport. In summer 2010, after 3 seasons with Belgrade's Rad, he signed with FK Zemun.

In summer 2011 he signed with Canadian Soccer League club Brantford Galaxy but during the following winter he returned to Serbia by joining FK Timok playing in the Serbian League East. At the end of the season they won promotion from the Serbian First League however during summer he moved to another First League club, RFK Novi Sad. In 2015, he returned to Canada to sign with his former club Brantford to compete in the 2015 season. After the merger between Hamilton with Brantford Galaxy he played with BGH City FC for the 2021 season.

Managerial career
In 2020, he served as the head coach for Brantford Galaxy in the Canadian Soccer League.

References

External links
 
 Profile at official FK Rad website

1982 births
Living people
Sportspeople from Banja Luka
Serbs of Bosnia and Herzegovina
Association football midfielders
Bosnia and Herzegovina footballers
FK Srem Jakovo players
FK Zemun players
FK Rad players
FK Timok players
RFK Novi Sad 1921 players
Brantford Galaxy players
Serbian SuperLiga players
Canadian Soccer League (1998–present) players
Bosnia and Herzegovina expatriate footballers
Expatriate soccer players in Canada
Bosnia and Herzegovina expatriate sportspeople in Canada
Bosnia and Herzegovina football managers
Canadian Soccer League (1998–present) managers
Serbian League players